Zhang Changhong (born 1958/59) is a Chinese entrepreneur, the chairman of DZH (formerly Shanghai Great Wisdom 上海大智慧), a financial data and software provider.

Early life
Zhang Changhong was born in 1958/59, and graduated from Suzhou University of Science and Technology in 1987.

Career
Zhang is chairman of DZH, which competes in China with Reuters and Bloomberg.

Personal life
He is married and lives in Shanghai, China.

References

1950s births
Living people
Businesspeople from Shanghai
Billionaires from Shanghai
Chinese technology company founders